Anagotus oconnori or astelia weevil is a large flightless weevil found in New Zealand. It was first collected on Mount Quoin in Wellington from Astelia by Mr A.C. O'Connor after whom this species was named.

Description
This weevil is reddish-brown with shining black areas on the mandibles, elytra, thorax and end of the rostrum. It has paler colouration on the sides and posterior of the elytra.

Distribution
The astelia weevil is found in alpine areas in both the North Island and South Island of New Zealand. These include the Tararua Range on the North Island and Mount Arthur on the South Island.

References

Endemic fauna of New Zealand
Taxa named by Thomas Broun
Beetles described in 1910
Endemic insects of New Zealand
Beetles of New Zealand